Lisa Moser is an American businesswoman, rancher, and politician serving as a member of the Kansas House of Representatives from the 106th district.

Background 
Moser earned a Bachelor of Science degree in animal science from Kansas State University in 1981. Mosner has worked as a farmer and is the co-owner of Moser Ranch. Elected to the Kansas House of Representatives in November 2020, she assumed office on January 11, 2021.

References 

Living people
Year of birth missing (living people)
Republican Party members of the Kansas House of Representatives
Kansas State University alumni
Women state legislators in Kansas
21st-century American women politicians
21st-century American politicians